Kobylanka  is a village in Stargard County, West Pomeranian Voivodeship, in north-western Poland. It is the seat of the gmina (administrative district) called Gmina Kobylanka.

For the history of the region, see History of Pomerania.

The village has a population of 1,513.

References

Kobylanka